Hello, Hello Brazil! (Portuguese: Allô, Allô, Brasil!) is a 1935 Brazilian musical film directed by Wallace Downey, Alberto Ribeiro and João de Barro. It stars Carmen Miranda and Adhemar Gonzaga; the latter also produced the film. The screenplay was written by Alberto Ribeiro and João de Barro.

Production 
Wallace Downey began his career producing successful musical films for Americans with established artists from Brazilian radio.  Carmen Miranda, star of this 1935 film, was one such star.  A co-production between Waldown Filmes and Cinédia, Allô, Allô, Brasil! presented a multitude of singers, comedians and radio presenters, such as vocalists Francisco Alves and Mário Reis.

A close tie-in with the radio world manifested in this films storyline. Written by popular composers duo João de Barros and Alberto Ribeiro, it portrayed the adventures of a "radiomaníaco" who falls for a nonexistent radio singer.

The two genres of music synonymous with the carnival, including the samba and the march, had a prominent place in early Brazilian musicals and popular movies.

Cast 

Almirante		
Ary Barroso	
Aurora Miranda		
Carmen Miranda		
Adhemar Gonzaga		
César Ladeira		
Virgínia Lane	
Francisco Alves
Mário Reis			
Ivo Astolphi ... as Bando da Lua
Dircinha Batista
Simão Boutman	
Sílvio Caldas		
Chico	Chico		
Apolo Correia	
Elisa Coelho de Almeida

References

External links

Further reading 
 Bryan McCann, Hello, Hello Brazil: Popular Music in the Making of Modern Brazil (Durham: Duke University Press, 2004)

1935 musical comedy films
1935 films
Brazilian musical comedy films
1930s Portuguese-language films
Brazilian black-and-white films
Lost Brazilian films
Cinédia films
1935 lost films
Lost musical comedy films